Threemilestone and Gloweth is an electoral division of Cornwall in the United Kingdom and returns one member to sit on Cornwall Council. The current Councillor is Dulcie Tudor, the leader of the Independent Alliance, a standalone independent group on the council.

Extent
Threemilestone and Gloweth covers the village of Threemilestone and Gloweth, a suburb of Truro containing Truro College, Richard Lander School and the Royal Cornwall Hospital. The division covers 369 hectares in total.

Election results

2017 election

2013 election

2009 election

References

Politics of Truro
Electoral divisions of Cornwall Council